Nariman Youssef is an Egyptian translator. She obtained a BSc in computer science from the American University in Cairo before moving to the UK for graduate studies. She has master's degrees from Birkbeck College and the University of Edinburgh, and is currently a doctoral candidate at Manchester University. She is affiliated with CASAW.

As a literary translator, Youssef has translated The American Granddaughter by the Iraqi writer Inaam Kachachi. This novel was shortlisted for the 2009 Arabic Booker Prize and the English translation has been published by Bloomsbury Qatar Foundation Publishing. Youssef's translation was praised by Banipal magazine: "Skillfully translated by Nariman Youssef, the English edition of The American Granddaughter is a welcome addition to Arabic literature in translation."

Youssef has also translated poetry by the Omani poet Abdullah al Ryami, among others. In addition, she has written an e-book about the Egyptian revolution under the title Summer of Unrest: Tahrir - 18 Days of Grace. This was released by Vintage Books.

See also
 List of Arabic-English translators

References

Arabic–English translators
Egyptian translators
The American University in Cairo alumni
Alumni of Birkbeck, University of London
Alumni of the University of Edinburgh
Alumni of the University of Manchester
Living people
Cairo University alumni
Year of birth missing (living people)